Daniel Mackensi Chávez Castillo (born 8 January 1988 in Callao) is a Peruvian footballer who is currently a free agent.

Attributes 
His preferred position is centre forward, however he is more effective on the wings because of his pace and acceleration, combined with his good crossing skills.

International goals

References

External links
 Profile at otelul-galati.ro 
 
 

1988 births
Living people
Sportspeople from Callao
Association football forwards
Peruvian footballers
Peru international footballers
Belgian Pro League players
Club Brugge KV players
K.V.C. Westerlo players
Liga I players
ASC Oțelul Galați players
Unión Comercio footballers
Club Deportivo Universidad César Vallejo footballers
FBC Melgar footballers
Club Universitario de Deportes footballers
Academia Deportiva Cantolao players
Peruvian expatriate footballers
Expatriate footballers in Belgium
Expatriate footballers in Romania
Peruvian expatriate sportspeople in Belgium
Peruvian expatriate sportspeople in Romania